Çamoba can refer to:

 Çamoba, Ezine
 Çamoba, Yenice